Jordan Williams (born October 13, 1990) is an American mixed martial artist who competed in the Welterweight division of the Ultimate Fighting Championship.

Background
Williams started fighting when a friend brought up the idea to him and his full-ride scholarship to UC Davis fell through when they dropped the wrestling program due to lack of funds. In 2010, at Sierra College, he was the California state community college wrestling champion at 197 pounds and All-American. As a 19-year-old college student in the middle of wrestling season, Williams was diagnosed with Type-1 Diabetes, after suddenly losing 20 pounds in 2 weeks. After losing to Kazula Vargas due to a cut, Williams was invited to train with David Terrell, where he has stayed since then.

Mixed martial arts career

Early career
In his MMA debut at CFFC Nor Cal Conflict, he defeated Sean Choice via TKO in the third round. Williams defeated JC Llamas via unanimous decision at TWC 19 Blackout. He lost to Kazula Vargas At TPF 19 via doctor stoppage due to a cut. At TPF 22 Champions Collide 2, he defeated Christian Barber via TKO in the first round. In his only appearance for West Coast Fighting Championship at WFC 15 Williams knocked out Richard Rigmaden in round one. At Tachi Palace Fights 25 he submitted Preston Scharf in the first round via rear naked choke to earn the first submission victory of his professional career. He would suffer his second loss of his MMA career to future UFC fighter Dwight Grant at Conquer FC 2 after getting knocked out in the first round. Williams would rebound, knocking out Alexander Lopez in the first round at Dragon House 28

In his debut appearance with Bellator MMA at Bellator 199, he defeated Brandon Hester via TKO in the second round to secure his first victory under the Bellator MMA banner.

Dana White's Contender Series
After racking a 7–2 record in California regional circuit and most lately Bellator, Williams was invited to face Tim Caron at Dana White's Contender Series 11 on June 26, 2018. He won the fight via third-round knockout, but the result was eventually overturned after Williams tested positive for cannabis metabolites. Williams was also fined and suspended for six months, making him eligible to return to competition on December 26, 2018.

After a technical knockout victory against Diego Herzog at Bellator 220, Williams returned to the Contender Series to face Ramazan Kuramagomedov at Dana White's Contender Series 21 on July 23, 2019. He lost the fight via split decision.

He made his third appearance in the series against Gregory Rodrigues at Dana White's Contender Series 33 on September 15, 2020. He won the fight via first-round knockout and was awarded a contract with the UFC.

Ultimate Fighting Championship
Williams made his promotional debut against Nassourdine Imavov at UFC on ESPN: Holm vs. Aldana on October 4, 2020. He lost the fight via unanimous decision.

Return to welterweight
He made his sophomore appearance against Mickey Gall at UFC on ESPN: Sandhagen vs. Dillashaw on July 24, 2021. He lost the fight via first-round submission.

Williams faced Ian Garry at UFC 268 on November 6, 2021. He lost the fight via knockout at the end of the first round.

On February 10, 2022, it was announced that Williams was released by UFC.

Championships and accomplishments
Dragon House
DH Middleweight Championship (One time; former)

Mixed martial arts record

|-
|Loss
|align=center|9–6 (1)
|Ian Garry
|KO (punches)
|UFC 268
|
|align=center|1
|align=center|4:59
|New York City, New York, United States
|
|-
|Loss
|align=center| 9–5 (1)
|Mickey Gall
|Submission (rear-naked choke)
|UFC on ESPN: Sandhagen vs. Dillashaw 
|
|align=center|1
|align=center|2:57
|Las Vegas, Nevada, United States
|
|-
| Loss
| align=center| 9–4 (1)
|Nassourdine Imavov
|Decision (unanimous)
|UFC on ESPN: Holm vs. Aldana
|
|align=center|3
|align=center|5:00
|Abu Dhabi, United Arab Emirates
|
|-
| Win
| align=center| 9–3 (1)
| Gregory Rodrigues
|KO (punches)
|Dana White's Contender Series 33
|
|align=center|1
|align=center|2:19
|Las Vegas, Nevada, United States
|
|-
| Loss
| align=center| 8–3 (1)
|Ramazan Kuramagomedov
| Decision (split)
| Dana White's Contender Series 21
| 
| align=center| 3
| align=center| 5:00
| Las Vegas, Nevada, United States
|
|-
| Win
| align=center|8–2 (1)
| Diego Herzog
|TKO (punches)
|Bellator 220
|
|align=center|3
|align=center|1:21
|San Jose, California, United States 
|
|-
| NC
| align=center|7–2 (1)
| Tim Caron
| No Contest (Overturned)
|Dana White's Contender Series 11
|
| align=center|3
| align=center|3:37
|Las Vegas, Nevada, United States
|
|-
| Win
| align=center|7–2
| Brandon Hester
|TKO (punches)
| Bellator 199
| 
|align=center|2
|align=center|1:11
| San Jose, California, United States
| 
|-
| Win
| align=center| 6–2
| Alex Lopez
| KO (punch)
| Dragon House 28
| 
| align=center| 1
| align=center| 0:24
| San Francisco, California, United States
| 
|-
| Loss
| align=center| 5–2
| Dwight Grant
|KO (punch)
|Conquer FC 2
|
|align=center|1
|align=center|2:47
|Richmond, California, United States
|
|-
| Win
| align=center| 5–1
|Preston Scharf
|Submission (rear-naked choke)
|TPF 25: Fall Brawl
|
|align=center|1
|align=center|1:42
|Lemoore, California, United States
|
|-
| Win
| align=center|4–1
|Richard Rigmaden
|KO (punch)
|West Coast FC 15
|
|align=center|1
|align=center|0:46
|Sacramento, California, United States
|
|-
| Win
| align=center| 3–1
| Cris Barber
|TKO (punches)
|TPF 22: Champions Collide II
|
|align=center|1
|align=center|1:14
|Lemoore, California, United States
|
|-
| Loss
| align=center|2–1
| Kazula Vargas
| TKO (doctor stoppage)
| TPF 19: Throwback Thursday
| 
| align=center| 1
| align=center| 5:00
|Lemoore, California, United States
|
|-
| Win
| align=center|2–0
| J.C. Llamas
| Decision (unanimous)
|TWC 19: Blackout
|
| align=center|3
| align=center|5:00
|Porterville, California, United States
|
|-
| Win
| align=center|1–0
| Sean Choice
| TKO (punches)
|Cage Combat FC
|
|align=center|3
|align=center|2:06
|Santa Rosa, California, United States
|

See also 
 List of current UFC fighters
 List of male mixed martial artists

References

External links 
  
  

1990 births
Living people
American male mixed martial artists
Welterweight mixed martial artists
Mixed martial artists utilizing collegiate wrestling
Ultimate Fighting Championship male fighters
American male sport wrestlers
Amateur wrestlers